Judith is a homily written by abbot Ælfric of Eynsham around the year 1000. It is extant in two manuscripts, a fairly complete version being found in Corpus Christi College Cambridge MS 303, and fragments in British Library MS Cotton Otho B.x, which came from the Cotton Library.

The homily is written in Old English alliterative prose. It is 452 verses long. The story paraphrases the Biblical original closely. Ælfric ends the homily with a detailed exegetical interpretation of the story, which he addresses to nuns.

In the first 190 lines, Ælfric introduces king Nebuchadnezzar and Holofernes, the leader of his army, whom he charges with conquering the land of the Jews. Holofernes complies and subdues most countries to the west of Assyria, except Bethulia, a Jewish town which resists the invader. At this point Judith is introduced.

As in the Bible, Judith is depicted as a wealthy, independent widow, who after the death of her husband has chosen to remain single and lead a clean and chaste life (lines 203-207). In his exegesis, Ælfric again stresses Judith's cleanness and chastity (lines 391-394). Judith is depicted as pious and steadfast in her traditions, even bringing her own food to the Assyrian's tent (lines 270-272). Ælfric thus represents Judith as a figure of identification for the nuns. 

Ælfric also stresses Judith's eloquence. She talks her way into the Assyrian's camp (lines 237-241), she talks Holofernes into drinking too much and falling asleep (lines 248-277) and after she has beheaded Holofernes she motivates the Bethulians to fight (lines 312-354).

See also
 Judith (poem), the other major Anglo-Saxon retelling of the story, in epic poetry.

Notes

References

 Assmann, Bruno (ed.), "Abt Ælfric's angelsächsische Homilie über das Buch Judith," Anglia, 10 (1888), 76-104; repr. in Angelsächsische Homilien und Heiligenleben, Bibliothek der angelsächsischen Prosa, 3 (Kassel, 1889; repr. with a supplementary introduction by Peter Clemoes, Darmstadt, 1964), pp. 102–16 (previously the standard edition).
 Clayton, Mary, 'Ælfric's Judith: Manipulative or Manipulated?', Anglo-Saxon England, 23 (1994), 215-227.
 Lee, S. D. (ed.), Ælfric's Homilies on 'Judith', 'Esther' and 'The Maccabees' (1999), http://users.ox.ac.uk/~stuart/kings/ (now the standard edition)
 Magennis, H., 'Contrasting Narrative Emphases in the Old English Poem Judith and Ælfric's Paraphrase of the Book of Judith', Neuphilologische Mitteilungen, 96 (1995), 61-66.

Christian sermons
Old English literature
11th-century Christian texts